Columbia Township is one of the twelve townships of Meigs County, Ohio, United States.  The 2000 census found 1,018 people in the township.

Geography
Located in the northwestern corner of the county, it borders the following townships:
Lee Township, Athens County - north
Alexander Township, Athens County - northeast corner
Scipio Township - east
Rutland Township - southeast corner
Salem Township - south
Wilkesville Township, Vinton County - southwest corner
Vinton Township, Vinton County - west
Knox Township, Vinton County - northwest

No municipalities are located in Columbia Township.

Name and history
Statewide, other Columbia Townships are located in Hamilton and Lorain counties.

Government
The township is governed by a three-member board of trustees, who are elected in November of odd-numbered years to a four-year term beginning on the following January 1. Two are elected in the year after the presidential election and one is elected in the year before it. There is also an elected township fiscal officer, who serves a four-year term beginning on April 1 of the year after the election, which is held in November of the year before the presidential election. Vacancies in the fiscal officership or on the board of trustees are filled by the remaining trustees.

References

External links
County website

Townships in Meigs County, Ohio
Townships in Ohio